The 1920 Indiana Hoosiers football team represented the Indiana Hoosiers in the 1920 college football season as members of the Big Ten Conference. The Hoosiers played their home games at Jordan Field in Bloomington, Indiana. The team was coached by Ewald O. Stiehm, in his fifth year as head coach.

Schedule

References

Indiana
Indiana Hoosiers football seasons
Indiana Hoosiers football